Pär Ericsson (born 21 July 1988), sometimes spelled Pär Eriksson, is a Swedish footballer who plays as a striker for Karlstad.

Career 
Born in Karlstad, he was raised in Deje. Starting his career in Deje IK, he later moved to Carlstad United BK. In 2008, he spent a short time in Degerfors IF, prior to 2009 season he was close to signing for Örgryte IS; however he instead signed for local rival GAIS as bosman; this upset Carlstad United as they were only receiving about 200,000 SEK while Örgryte IS's bid was claimed to be at least twice as big.

On 25 December 2009, it was announced that IFK Göteborg had signed him for an undisclosed fee. Ericsson failed to make an impact in Göteborg, only scoring once in 17 games and found himself starting on the substitute bench, meanwhile Mjällby AIF was faced with problems following the departure of their main forward Moestafa El Kabir to Cagliari, as a result Ericsson was loaned out to Mjällby during the summer for the duration of the 2011 season. Prior to the 2012 season he returned to Göteborg, in hopes that the new manager Mikael Stahre would give him a chance in the team, he however found himself outside the starting line-up and was soon loaned out to Mjällby yet again for the entire season.

References

Kalmar FF dumpar petad anfallare: “Bäst för min fotbollskarriär”, 24kalmar.se, 9 June 2016

External links
 GAIS profile
 Eliteprospects.com profile
 
 

1988 births
Living people
Swedish footballers
Sweden under-21 international footballers
Swedish expatriate footballers
GAIS players
IFK Göteborg players
Mjällby AIF players
R.A.E.C. Mons players
Kalmar FF players
Örebro SK players
Kongsvinger IL Toppfotball players
Allsvenskan players
Belgian Pro League players
Expatriate footballers in Belgium
Association football forwards
Sportspeople from Karlstad